Esmail Mohammad (born 4 September 1960) is a former Afghanistan boxer, who competed at the 1980 Summer Olympic Games in the featherweight event.

1980 Olympic results
Below is the record of Esmail Mohammad, an Afghani featherweight boxer who competed at the 1980 Moscow Olympics:

 Round of 64: bye
 Round of 32: lost to Rudi Fink (East Germany) by first-round knockout

References

Boxers at the 1980 Summer Olympics
Olympic boxers of Afghanistan
1960 births
Living people
Afghan male boxers
Featherweight boxers